Michael Willis is an Indologist and historian based in London, England.

Born in Vancouver, British Columbia and raised in Kuwait and Saudi Arabia, Willis took his B.A. degree at the University of Victoria where he studied with Siri Gunasinghe and Alan Gowans. Travelling to the University of Chicago, he studied with J. A. B. van Buitenen and Pramod Chandra, receiving his doctoral degree in 1988 after periods in India and Cyprus. He joined the British Museum in 1994 after teaching at SUNY New Paltz. He was the curator of the early south Asian and Himalayan collections in the Department of Asia at the museum from 1994 until 2014 at which time he became Corresponding Principal Investigator of Beyond Boundaries, a research project funded by the European Research Council. That project generated a number of outputs, including The South Asia Inscriptions Database. The project ended in 2020.

Willis's main research interest has been the cultural, political and religious history of  India from the fifth to the sixteenth centuries. He has published on the inscriptions of central India and its early temple architecture. After that, Willis turned his attention to the Gupta dynasty, publishing a monograph on Hindu ritual and the development of temples as land-holding institutions, The Archaeology of Hindu Ritual (2009).

Willis has also researched the Buddhist history of India and produced a catalogue of reliquaries and related materials in the British Museum and Victoria and Albert Museum. Concurrently Willis developed an interest in Tibet and published a popular book on the subject.  More recently he has been involved in a study of the Testament of Ba, producing a text and translation of the earliest surviving manuscript.

References

External links
Royal Asiatic Society 
ORCID 
SIDDHAM 

British Indologists
Living people
Writers from Vancouver
University of Victoria alumni
University of Chicago alumni
English Indologists
Historians of Indian art
Year of birth missing (living people)